Robert Mathews may refer to:
 Robert Hamilton Mathews (1841–1918), Australian anthropologist and linguist who studied Australian Aborigines
 Robert Henry Mathews (1877–1970), Australian missionary and sinologist
 Robert Jay Mathews (1953–1984), American neo-Nazi leader
 Robert L. Mathews (c. 1887–1947), American football player and coach
 Bobby Mathews (1851–1898), baseball player
 Bob Mathews (footballer) (1912–1989), Australian rules footballer
 Bobby Mathews (general), Indian Army officer

See also
 Robert Matthews (disambiguation)
 Robert Mathew (1911–1966), British barrister and politician
 Robert Matthew (disambiguation)